The Vancouver Folk Music Festival (VFMF), founded in 1978, is an outdoor multistage music festival, located at Jericho Beach Park on the west side of Vancouver, British Columbia.  It takes place annually, on the third weekend of July.

The festival has attracted artists from across the world, including Adam Cohen, Ani Difranco, Utah Phillips, Ricky Pinball, Tuvan Throat singers, Sarah Harmer, Veda Hille, Feist, K'naan, and Ferron, among many others.

2016 Lineup
The 39th annual festival was held July 15–17, 2016.

Jojo Abot
Ajinai
Elida Almeida
The Americans
Faris Amine
Geoff Berner
The Bills
Birds of Chicago
Hayes Carll
Martin and Eliza Carthy
Bruce Cockburn
The Crooked Brothers
Élage Diouf
Mike Edel
Emilie and Ogden
Lee Fields and the Expressions
Dominique Fricot
Martin Harley
The Harpoonist & the Axe Murderer
Les Hay Babies
Jolie Holland and Samantha Parton
I Draw Slow
Hubby Jenkins
Kaumakaiwa Kanaka‘ole with Shawn Pimental
Shane Koyczan and The Short Story Long
Lakou Mizik
Land of Talk
Lisa LeBlanc
Leftover Salmon
Terra Lightfoot
Little Scream
Lord Huron
Betsayda Machado y La Parranda el Clavo
Mandolin Orange
Mexican Institute of Sound
Moulettes
Nahko and Medicine for People
Flávia Nascimento
The New Pornographers
Les Noces Gitanes
Cian Nugent
Lisa O'Neill
Oh Pep!
Oysterband
Chris Pureka
The Ragpicker String Band
Karim Saada
San Fermin
Sarah Jane Scouten
Ten Strings and a Goat Skin
Trad.Attack!
Twin Bandit
Henry Wagons
The Wainwright Sisters
M Ward
Lucy Ward
The Weather Station
Yemen Blues with Ravid Kahalani
The Young’uns

2015 Lineup
The 38th annual festival was held July 17–19, 2015.

100 Mile House
Ross Ainslie and Jarlath Henderson
Annie Lou
Matthew Barber and Jill Barber
Beans on Toast
Lurrie Bell
Blind Pilot
Breabach
Basia Bulat
Bustamento
Sousou and Maher Cissoko
Adam Cohen
Diyet
Cécile Doo-Kingué
The Down Hill Strugglers
Frazey Ford
Fortunate Ones
La Gallera Social Club
Mary Gauthier
Jenn Grant
Ash Grunwald
I'm With Her
The Jerry Cans
Angélique Kidjo
Bassekou Kouyaté & Ngoni Ba
Pokey LaFarge
Sam Lee (folk musician) and Friends
The Lowest Pair
Lucius
Bongeziwe Mabandla
Mama Kin
Matuto
Rory McLeod
Melbourne Ska Orchestra
Old Man Luedecke
The Once
Lindi Ortega
Parsonsfield
Perch Creek
Grace Petrie
Phosphorescent
Les Poules à Colin
Rising Appalachia
The Sadies
Said the Whale
Scarlett Jane
Shtreiml & Ismail Fencioglu
Son Little
Söndörgö
The Strumbellas
Tanga
Richard Thompson
Trampled By Turtles
Ivan Tucakov and Tambura Rasa
The Wilderness of Manitoba
Marlon Williams
Hawksley Workman
Jasper Sloan Yip

2014 Lineup
The 37th annual festival was held July 18–20, 2014.

Banda Kakana
Andrew Bird and the Hands of Glory
Born Ruffians
Brasstronaut
David Bridie
The Carper Family
The Como Mamas
Rose Cousins
The Casey Driessen Singularity
Dulsori
Quique Escamilla
Alejandro Escovedo and the Sensitive Boys
Fish and Bird
Flying Mountain
Ashleigh Flynn & the Back Porch Majority
Beppe Gambetta
Geoumungo Factory
Eliza Gilkyson
Great Lake Swimmers
Grievous Angels
James Hill
The Honeycutters
The Howlin' Brothers
Tamar Ilana & Ventanas
Iskwew Singers
Stephen Kellogg
Roger Knox
Seun Kuti and Egypt 80
Mary Lambert
Jon Langford and Jean Cook
Amos Lee
Lemon Bucket Orkestra
Lost Bayou Ramblers
Jay Malinowski & The Deadcoast
La Manta
Samantha Martin & Delta Sugar
Tift Merritt
Mokoomba
Leo Moran and Anthony Thistlethwaite
The Nautical Miles
Oh My Darling
Ozomatli
Pacifika
Karine Polwart
Alejandra Ribera
Jenny Ritter
David Rovics
Noura Mint Seymali
Langhorne Slim & the Law
Leonard Sumner
Oliver Swain's Big Machine
Riccardo Tesi & Banditaliana
Les Tireux D'Roches
Typhoon
Foy Vance
Suzie Vinnick
Wagons
Leo "Bud" Welch
Josh White Jr.
Wintersleep
Frank Yamma

2013 Lineup
The 36th annual festival was held July 19–21, 2013.

Lena Anderssen
Sam Baker
Del Barber
Black Prairie
Bon Debarras
Dalannah Gail Bowen
Briga 
The Brothers Comatose
Jeffery Broussard & the Creole Cowboys
Brown Bird
Jason Burnstick
The Cat Empire
Tim Chaisson
Cold Specks
Debo Band
Delhi 2 Dublin
DeVotchKa
Joaquin Diaz
The Raghu Dixit Project
Maria Dunn
Kathleen Edwards
Steve Earle & The Dukes
Elephant Revival
Hannah Georgas
Sarah Lee Guthrie and Johnny Irion
Habadekuk
Hanggai
Hayden
Hazmat Modine
Hurray for the Riff Raff
Reid Jamieson
Anthony Joseph and the Spasm Band
The Alan Kelly Gang
Mo Kenney
Kaki King
Aidan Knight
Kobo Town
The Latchikós
The Littlest Birds
Mamselle
Natalie Maines
Maria in the Shower
Danny Michel
Nomadic Massive
Jerron "Blind Bow" Paxton
Phildel
Martha Redbone Roots Project
Pharis and Jason Romero
Justin Rutledge
Stefano Saletti and Piccola Banda Ikona
The Shirleys
Sierra Leone's Refugee All Stars
moira smiley & VOCO
Kinnie Starr
Jayme Stone
Stringband
Vancouver Chinese Music Ensemble
Tinpan Orange
Los Vega
The Waterboys
Loudon Wainwright III
Sara Watkins
Whitehorse
The Wooden Sky
Fatma Zidan
Laetitia Zonzambé

2012 Lineup
The 35th annual festival was held July 13–15, 2012.

The Atomic Duo
The Barr Brothers
Geoff Berner
Mark Berube
Besh o droM
Bette and Wallet
Blitz the Ambassador
Bombolessé
Bryan Bowers
Canailles
The Cave Singers
Chatham County Line
The Johnny Clegg Band
Amelia Curran
Dala
Kat Danser
Ani DiFranco
Colleen Eccleston
Ramblin' Jack Elliott
e.s.l.
David Essig
Mike Farris & the Cumberland Saints
Fearing & White
Roy Forbes
Jaron Freeman Fox and the Opposite of Everything
Tret Fure
Los Gaiteros de San Jacinto
Leela Gilday
Good for Grapes
The Head and the Heart
Hey Rosetta!
Veda Hille
H'Sao
Jaffa Road
Martyn Joseph
K'naan
Murray McLauchlan 
Dan Mangan
Marley's Ghost
Emel Mathlouthi 
Minor Empire
Mrigya
Holly Near
The Once
evalyn parry
Pied Pumkin
Possessed by Paul James
River City Extension
Alejandra Robles
Serena Ryder
Shakura S'Aida
Silk Road Music
Sidi Touré
Wake Owl
Cedric Watson et Bijou Créole
Wazimbo
Ken Whiteley and the Levy Sisters
Lucinda Williams
The Wood Brothers
Royal Wood

2011 Lineup
The 34th annual festival was held July 15–17, 2011.

Freshlyground
Justin Townes Earle
Gillian Welch
James Cotton Superharp
Tim Robbins and the Rouges Gallery Band
Ti-Coca and Wanga Neges
Rosanne Cash
The Jayhawks
La-33
Josh Ritter and the Royal City Band
Tinariwen
Emmanuel Jal
Beats Antique
The Duhks
Buck 65
Jim Bryson and The Weakerthans
C.R. Avery
 Pokey LaFarge and the South City Three
Elliott BROOD
Kathryn Calder
The Burning Hell
David Wax Museum

2010 Lineup
The 33rd annual festival was held July 16–18, 2010. Artists included:

Gadelle
Shane Koyczan and the Short Story Long
The Avett Brothers
Calexico
Sarah Harmer
Naomi Shelton and the Gospel Queens
Brett Dennen
Natacha Atlas
Ricky Skaggs and Kentucky Thunder

2009 Lineup
The 32nd annual festival was held on July 17–19, 2009.

Los De Abajo
Justin Adams and Juldeh Camara
Matt Anderson
Darol Anger, Mike Marshall with Vasen
Arrested Development
Bellowhead
Geoff Berner
Mark Berube and the Patriotic Few
The Blue Voodoo
Bop Ensemble
The Breakmen
Basia Bulat
CaneFire
Eliana Cuevas
The Ebony Hillbillies
Tony McManus
Jorge Miguel Flamenco
Los Misioneros del Norte
Mr. Something Something
Matabaruka
Idy Oulo
Jonathan Edwards
Joel Fafard
Roy Forbes
Fito Garcia Afro-Cuban Bass Ensemble
Amos Garrett Acoustic Trio with Doug Cox
Doug Cox
Liza Garza
Dick Gaughan
Great Lake Swimmers
HAPA
Corey Harris
Veda Hille
Iron and Wine
James Keelaghan
Labess
Patty Larkin
Anne Loree
Dan Mangan
Pacifika
Steven Page
The Paperboys
The Proclaimers
Joe Pug
Lester Quitzau
Kate Reid
Sara Renelik
The Reverend Peyton's Big Damn Band
Rock Plaza Central
Zal Idrissa Sissokho and Buntalo
Mavis Staples 
Tarhana
Shari Ulrich
Umalali
Suzie Vinnick and Rick Fines
Vishten
VOC Soul Gospel Choir
The Weakerthans
Cheryl Wheeler
Women in Docs
Jamyang Yeshi
d'bi. young

2008 Lineup
The 31st annual festival was held from July 18–20, 2008. Artists included:

Michael Franti & Spearhead
Master Musicians of Jajouka
Ozomatli
Aimee Mann
Kiran Ahluwalia
Etran Finatawa
Markus James and the Wassonrai and Eneida Marta.

2007 Lineup
The 30th annual festival was held from July 13–15, 2007.

Rani Arbo and Daisy Mayhem
The Be Good Tanyas
Geoff Berner
Bitch and the Exciting Conclusion
Jim Byrnes, Steve Dawson and The Soujourners with the House Band
Carolina Chocolate Drops
Liz Carroll & John Doyle
Cornerstone
Toumani Diabate's Symmetric Orchestra
Kellylee Evans
The Fugitives
Mike Ford
David Francey
Ganga Giri
Hip Hop Hope
Jamaica to Toronto
Jam Camp
Martyn Joseph
Andrea Koziol
Kutapira
The Life and Times of Ginger Goodwin
Los Munequitos de Matanzas
Dougie MacLean
Mihirangi
Sarah Jane Morris
Geoff Muldaur
Mushfiq Ensemble
Next...The Collaboratory
Nucleus
Oh Susanna
Old Man Luedecke
Ndidi Onukwulu
Utah Phillips
Po' Girl
Salt
Karen Savoca
Adham Shaikh's Dreamtree Project
Adrian Sherwood
Songs of the Pacific Northwest
Tanya Tagaq
Tapia eta Leturia
30 Years in 60 Minutes with Timothy Wisdom
The Truckers Memorial
Twilight Circus Dub Sound System
Under the Volcano – Rhyme and Resist!
Vancouver International Bhangra Celebration
The Wailin' Jennys
Hawksley Workman
You Are Here (with Rae Spoon)

2006 Lineup
The 29th annual VFMF was held from July 14–16, 2006.

A Bhangra Celebration
Afrodizz
Angela Harris
Beats Without Borders
Bethany and Rufus
Big Bass Theory
Clifton Joseph
Collaboratory 2.9
Dan Bern
Dubblestandart
Dyad
Eliza Gilkyson
Erynn Marshall and Chris Coole
Feist
Ga Gi
Ganga Giri
Hamell on Trial
Ivan Coyote and The Word on The Beach
Jacob Cino and Third Eye Tribe
James Keelaghan
Jane Siberry
Kelly Joe Phelps
Lal
Leaky Heaven Circus presents Giant Consortium
Lillian Allen
Linda Tillery and Nina Gerber
Mihirangi
Najma Akhtar
Ndidi Onukwulu featuring Madagascar Slim
no luck club
Nucleus
Ray Wylie Hubbard
Ridley Bent
Ruthie Foster
Salt
Sisters Euclid
Supergenerous
Tanya Tagaq
The Angel Brothers feat. Sandhya Sanjana
The Grande Mothers
The Mammals
The Mighty Popo with Urunana rw'abadatana
The New Lost City Ramblers
Tim Readman & Shona Le Mottée
Utah Phillips
Vishwa Mohan Bhatt & Salil Bhatt
Zar

References

External links
Vancouver Folk Music Festival Official site
Vancouver Folk Music Festival Scrapbook
VFMF Flickr Group
VFMF MySpace Community

Folk festivals in Canada
Music festivals in Vancouver
Music festivals established in 1978